The Upper Mohawk First Nation is a Mohawk band based in southern Ontario, and is a member nation of the Six Nations of the Grand River. Members of the Upper Mohawk share the territory of Six Nations, and is governed under their council.

References

Mohawk tribe
First Nations governments in Ontario